Sunnyside, also known as the R.B. Whitley House, is a historic home located in Wendell, North Carolina, a town in eastern Wake County. The Craftsman house was built in 1918 by R. B. Whitley, a prominent Wendell businessman who founded the Bank of Wendell in 1907.

The brick home features car shelters on the front and side, a modern detail during the 1910s. In addition to the home, a wash house, smokehouse, garage, and four entrance pillars are located on the property. According to family tradition, Sunnyside was used as a hospital during the Spanish flu epidemic of 1918.

Sunnyside was listed on the National Register of Historic Places in October 2001.

See also
 List of Registered Historic Places in North Carolina

References

Houses on the National Register of Historic Places in North Carolina
Houses completed in 1918
Greek Revival houses in North Carolina
American Craftsman architecture in North Carolina
Houses in Wake County, North Carolina
National Register of Historic Places in Wake County, North Carolina